Ariane Bonhomme  (born 2 April 1995 in Gatineau, Quebec) is a Canadian track cyclist, representing Canada at international competitions. She won the gold medal at the 2016 Pan American Track Cycling Championships in the team pursuit.

She has qualified to represent Canada at the 2020 Summer Olympics.

Career results
2016
Pan American Track Championships
1st  Team Pursuit (with Kinley Gibson, Jamie Gilgen and Jasmin Glaesser)
3rd  Points Race
2017
2nd  Team Pursuit, Round 1, (Pruszków) Track Cycling World Cup (with Allison Beveridge, Annie Foreman-Mackey and Kinley Gibson)

References

External links

1995 births
Living people
Canadian female cyclists
Canadian track cyclists
Place of birth missing (living people)
Cyclists at the 2018 Commonwealth Games
Cyclists at the 2020 Summer Olympics
Olympic cyclists of Canada
Commonwealth Games medallists in cycling
Commonwealth Games bronze medallists for Canada
Cyclists at the 2022 Commonwealth Games
Commonwealth Games competitors for Canada
21st-century Canadian women
Medallists at the 2018 Commonwealth Games